Women are able to be Members of Parliament in France; in the National Assembly. Women have been able to be involved in French legislative political life since 1945.

History 
A record number of women were elected at the 2017 French legislative election and sit as deputies in the 15th National Assembly of France.

Over time

List of women MPs

1945

1946

2017 French legislative election

15th legislature of the French Fifth Republic (mid-term changes)

16th legislature of the French Fifth Republic 

 Béatrice Bellamy
 Fanta Berete
 Sophia Chikirou
 Alma Dufour
 Dominique Faure
 Sarah Legrain
 Christine Loir
 Pascale Martin
 Joëlle Mélin
 Nathalie Oziol
 Anna Pic
 Danielle Simonnet

References

See also 
 Women in the House of Commons of the United Kingdom
 Women in the House of Lords

French women in politics
National Assembly (France)
Women's rights in France
Lists of women legislators